Leon Palmer was an American Negro league outfielder between 1926 and 1930.

Palmer made his Negro leagues debut in 1926 with the Dayton Marcos. In 16 recorded games with the Louisville Black Caps in 1930, he posted six hits and five RBI in 43 plate appearances.

References

External links
 and Seamheads

Year of birth missing
Year of death missing
Place of birth missing
Place of death missing
Dayton Marcos players
Louisville Black Caps players
Baseball outfielders